Oskar Kaplur (Oscar F. Kaplyur; ;  – 20 September 1962) was a Russian wrestler. He competed for Russian Empire in the lightweight event at the 1912 Summer Olympics.

He lived in the United States from 1913 to 1918, returned to Russia in 1918 and worked in aircraft industry. He was known as inventor of Kaplyurit, plastic-impregnated plywood reinforced with internal steel gauze.

References

External links
 

1889 births
1962 deaths
Sportspeople from Tallinn
People from the Governorate of Estonia
Estonian male sport wrestlers
Olympic wrestlers of Russia
Wrestlers at the 1912 Summer Olympics
Russian male sport wrestlers